Augusta Van Buren and Adeline Van Buren, sisters, rode 5,500 miles in 60 days to cross the continental United States, each on their own motorcycle, completing on 8 September 1916. In so doing they became the second and third women to drive motorcycles across the entire continent, following Effie Hotchkiss, who had completed a Brooklyn-to-San Francisco route the year before with her mother, Avis, as a sidecar passenger.

History of the ride

The sisters descended from Martin Van Buren, the eighth President of the United States. In 1916, 32-year-old Augusta and 27-year-old Adeline Van Buren, or Gussie and Addie as they were known, were young and active in the national Preparedness Movement. America was about to enter World War I, and the sisters wanted to prove that women could ride as well as men and would be able to serve as military dispatch riders, freeing up men for other tasks. They also hoped to remove one of the primary arguments for denying women the right to vote. For their ride, they dressed in military-style leggings and leather riding breeches, a taboo at that time.

They set out from Sheepshead Bay Race Track in Brooklyn, New York on July 4, riding 1,000 cc Indian Power Plus motorcycles equipped with gas headlights. Indians were the high-end motorcycle at the time, selling for $275, and ran Firestone "non-skid" tires.

They arrived in Los Angeles on September 8 after having to contend with poor roads, heavy rains and mud, natural barriers like the Rocky Mountains, and social barriers such as the local police who took offense at their choice of men's clothing. During the ride, they were arrested numerous times, not for speeding but for wearing men's clothes. In Colorado, they became the first women to reach the 14,109-foot summit of Pikes Peak by any motor vehicle. Later on, they became lost in the desert 100 miles west of Salt Lake City and were saved by a prospector after their water ran out. They completed their ride by traveling across the border to Tijuana in Mexico.

Despite succeeding in their trek, the sisters' applications to be military dispatch riders were rejected. Reports in the leading motorcycling magazine of the day praised the bike but not the sisters and described the journey as a "vacation". One newspaper published a degrading article accusing the sisters of using the national preparedness issue as an excellent excuse to escape their roles as housewives and "display their feminine counters in nifty khaki and leather uniforms".

Later life
Adeline continued her career as an educator, and earned her law degree from New York University.  Augusta became a pilot and joined Amelia Earhart's Ninety-Nines international women's flying organization.

Memorial
In 1988, their achievement was celebrated by four women members of the American Motorcyclist Association (AMA) with the "Van Buren Transcon", a fund-raising effort for the Juvenile Diabetes Research Foundation supported by Honda, Kawasaki, Suzuki and Yamaha and designed to improve the public perception of motorcycling.

In 2002, the sisters were inducted into the AMA's  Motorcycle Hall of Fame and into the Sturgis Motorcycle Museum & Hall of Fame during 2003.

In 2006 Bob Van Buren, great-nephew of the sisters, and his wife, Rhonda Van Buren, retraced the route taken by Gussie and Addie on a Harley-Davidson Low Rider from New York City to San Francisco. In line with the sisters' desire to influence the military, the trip was a fundraiser for the Intrepid Fallen Heroes Fund and was launched from the Intrepid Sea, Air & Space Museum in Manhattan. Contributions  to the fund helped to build a new rehabilitation hospital at Brooke Army Medical Center (BAMC) in San Antonio, Texas.

References

External links
 Augusta and Adeline Van Buren - Women's First Solo Transcontinental Motorcycle Journey
 Motorcycle Museum Hall of Fame: Adeline and Augusta VanBuren

American automotive pioneers
Women motorcyclists
Long-distance motorcycle riders